Pelin Çelik (born 23 May 1982 in Istanbul) is a Turkish volleyball player. She is 172 cm and plays as setter for Azeri volleyball club Azerrail Baku. She studied at Istanbul Bilgi University.

She played 275 times for national team. She also played for Fenerbahçe Acıbadem, Vakıfbank, Vakıfbank Güneş Sigorta and Yeşilyurt in Turkey and also played for Rabita Baku in Azerbaijan for four months contract.

Her father Hüseyin Çelik was a footballer and played for Gençlerbirliği, Adana Demirspor, Fenerbahçe and Mersin İdmanyurdu.

Club career
1997-00  VakıfBank Ankara
  The Champion Clubs Runners-up (2): 1997–98, 1998–99
  Turkish League (1): 1997-98
  Turkish Cup (1): 1997-98
2000-01  VakıfBank Güneş Sigorta
2001-03  Yeşilyurt
2003-06  Türk Telekom
2006-08  Fenerbahçe Acıbadem
  Turkish League  Runners-up (2): 2006–07, 2007–08
2008-09  DYO Karşıyaka
2009-10  Ankaragücü
2010-11  Beşiktaş
2011-12  Rabita Baku
  FIVB Volleyball Women's Club World Championship: 2011
2011-12  Azerrail Baku

National team
2003-...  Turkey
 Women's European Volleyball Championship: 2003
 Women's European Volleyball League 2009
 2009 European Volleyball League "Best Setter"

See also
 Turkish women in sports

References

External links
 

1982 births
Living people
Volleyball players from Istanbul
Turkish women's volleyball players
VakıfBank S.K. volleyballers
Yeşilyurt volleyballers
Türk Telekom volleyballers
Fenerbahçe volleyballers
Karşıyaka volleyballers
Beşiktaş volleyballers
Turkish expatriate volleyball players
Turkish expatriate sportspeople in Azerbaijan
Istanbul Bilgi University alumni
Mediterranean Games medalists in volleyball
Mediterranean Games silver medalists for Turkey
Competitors at the 2009 Mediterranean Games